Liga Deportiva Universitaria de Quito's 1989 season was the club's 59th year of existence, the 36th year in professional football and the 29th in the top level of professional football in Ecuador.

Kits
Sponsor(s): Philips

Squad

Competitions

Serie A

First stage

Results

Second stage

Results

References
RSSSF - 1989 Serie A

External links
Official Site 
Técnico Universitario (0) - LDU Quito (3) 3rd goal

1989